The Ocean Survey Vessel (OSV) Bold was operated by the United States Environmental Protection Agency. Originally commissioned as the USNS Vigorous, it was renamed USNS Bold (T-AGOS-12) and was a Stalwart-class Auxiliary General Ocean Surveillance Ship of the [Military Sealift Command of the United States Navy, as designated by the "T" preface to her AGOS classification].
Stalwart class ships were originally designed to collect underwater acoustical data in support of Cold war anti-submarine warfare operations in the 1980s.

The ship was transferred to the EPA in 2004. The ship is equipped with sidescan sonar, underwater video, water and sediment sampling instruments in study of ocean and coastline.  One of the major missions of the Bold is to monitor sites where materials are dumped from dredging operations in U.S. ports for ecological impact. In 2013, the Bold was awarded to Seattle Central Community College (SCCC) by the General Services Administration. SCCC demonstrated in a competition that they would put it to the highest and best purpose, and acquired the ship at a cost of $5,000.

However, by 2015 SCCC had failed to develop the plans for the BOLD which they had pledged to the GSA to implement and as such GSA placed the ship for sale to the general public.  By the middle of the year the ship was auctioned to an undisclosed party who moved the ship to Lake Union Drydock in Seattle for layberthing.  The ship has since been placed for sale on eBay for $4M.

References

NavSource 

 

Stalwart-class ocean surveillance ships
Cold War auxiliary ships of the United States
Ships built by Tacoma Boatbuilding Company
1989 ships
Ships of the United States Environmental Protection Agency